Switchin' Kitten is a Tom and Jerry animated short film, released on September 7, 1961. It was the first cartoon in the series to be directed by Gene Deitch and produced by William L. Snyder in Czechoslovakia, after William Hanna and Joseph Barbera departed from MGM. It is also the first Tom and Jerry cartoon in the 1960s and the first of the Western cartoons that is made in Eastern Europe, as well as in an Eastern Bloc (Second World) country.

Plot
During a storm, Tom is trying to find a place to stay after being kicked out of a horse-drawn carriage. Meanwhile, Jerry is assisting a mad scientist in a stereotypical old castle. In their experiment, they switch the brains of an orange cat and blue-gray dog. The scientist gives the cat-with-a-dog-brain to Jerry as a companion. While they are sleeping, Tom approaches the castle, capturing Jerry. The cat growls and takes Jerry back, threatening Tom. Tom tries to convince the cat that he is a cat, but fails.

Tom's continuous efforts to catch Jerry are thwarted by the cat, like getting crushed by a hammer with his head and feet sticking out, getting turned into a flower, getting thrown out of the window and getting hit by a small axe. After going through a series of beaker tubes, Tom tries to escape from the castle in fright. Along the way, he comes into contact with other animals that the scientist has experimented on, including a bird-voiced elephant, a chicken that bleats like a sheep or a lamb, the blue dog whose brain was switched with the cat and a cuckoo clock's mooing bird. He then encounters Jerry, and begs and pleads for him to squeak, but the mouse roars like Leo the Lion and even has a gold-ribboned mouse hole (with the phrase of Ars Gratia Artis as part on the MGM logo). Terrified, he blasts off like a rocket out of the castle and runs off, never to be seen again. The clouds separate revealing Jerry breaking the fourth wall by winking at the camera as the cartoon closes with the same opening template, with the only difference being that Tom's face is depressed and Jerry's face is proud.

Cast

 Allen Swift as Tom Cat, Jerry Mouse, and Mad Scientist (uncredited)

References

External links 
 
 

1960 animated films
Films directed by Gene Deitch
Mad scientist films
Tom and Jerry short films
1960s American animated films
1960 comedy films
Body swapping in films
Animated films without speech
1960 films
1960 short films
Metro-Goldwyn-Mayer short films
Metro-Goldwyn-Mayer animated short films
Rembrandt Films short films
1960s English-language films